Robert Sutton (born 30 May 1940) is a New Zealand former cricketer. He played 56 first-class matches for Auckland between 1958 and 1974.

See also
 List of Auckland representative cricketers

References

External links
 

1940 births
Living people
New Zealand cricketers
Auckland cricketers
People from Romford
Sportspeople from Essex